Lane Phillip MacDermid (born August 25, 1989) is an American-born Canadian former professional ice hockey forward. He played in the National Hockey League (NHL) with the Boston Bruins, Dallas Stars and Calgary Flames.

Playing career
MacDermid was selected by the Boston Bruins in the fourth round (112th overall) of the 2009 NHL Entry Draft. After starting his professional career with the club's American Hockey League (AHL) affiliate, the Providence Bruins, and in his fourth year with the Bruins organization, on March 3, 2012, MacDermid was recalled to Boston for the first time after an injury to Daniel Paille.

During the shortened 2012–13 season, on April 2, 2013, MacDermid was traded by the Boston Bruins (along with prospect, Cody Payne, and a conditional second-round draft pick) to the Dallas Stars in exchange for Jaromír Jágr. In his Stars debut, he scored his first NHL goal and point in a defeat against the Anaheim Ducks on April 3, 2013. His father Paul MacDermid scored his first career NHL goal 31 years ago to the day, one of two sets to do it.

Developing as a fourth-line grinder who finishes his checks and is willing to stick up for his teammates, MacDermid made the Dallas Stars roster to open the 2013–14 season. After only six games with the Stars through the first two months of the season, MacDermid was traded to the Calgary Flames for a 2014 sixth-round pick on November 22, 2013. He was assigned to their AHL affiliate, the Abbotsford Heat, before he was later recalled and made his Flames debut, fighting against Cody McLeod of the Colorado Avalanche, on December 6, 2013. It was his only appearance with the Flames before he was returned to the Heat.

On February 25, 2014, MacDermid announced his retirement at age 24 shortly after being suspended from the Calgary Flames for failing to report to the Abbotsford Heat. He said his decision to retire was due to no longer having the desire to play professional hockey.

Personal life
MacDermid is the son of former NHL player Paul MacDermid and was born in Hartford, Connecticut, during his father's stint with the Hartford Whalers, but was raised in Sauble Beach, Ontario. His younger brother, Kurtis plays in the NHL with the Colorado Avalanche.

Career statistics

References

External links

1989 births
Living people
Abbotsford Heat players
Boston Bruins draft picks
Boston Bruins players
Calgary Flames players
Canadian ice hockey left wingers
Dallas Stars players
Ice hockey players from Connecticut
Ice hockey people from Ontario
Owen Sound Attack players
People from Bruce County
Providence Bruins players
Sportspeople from Hartford, Connecticut
Windsor Spitfires players